Amagá is a town and municipality in Antioquia Department, Colombia.

Amaga may also refer to:
Amaga (planarian), a genus of land planarians from South America
Australian Museums and Galleries Association (AMaGA)